Dragutin Anastasijević (Kragujevac, 30 July 1877 – Belgrade, 20 August 1950) was Serbian byzantinist and philologist, a member of Serbian Academy of Sciences and Arts.

Biography 
Anastasijević completed gymnasium in Belgrade and in 1900 he graduated from the Grandes écoles (later to become the University of Belgrade) in classical philology and Byzantine Studies. At professor Božidar Prokić's recommendation he continued to pursue Byzantine Studies and modern Greek philology in Munich (his mentor was Karl Krumbacher) where he got his PhD in 1905. He was professor of Byzantine studies on University of Belgrade Faculty of Philosophy from 1906.

When army of Kingdom of Serbia occupied Ottoman Albania in 1912, Anastasijević was engaged as translator for Greek language and after a while he was appointed on position of governor of Durrës County.

He was elected member of Serbian Academy of Sciences and Arts in 1946.

See also
 Stevan Dimitrijević
 Gabriel Millet
 Nikodim Kondakov
 Ljuba Kovačević
 Ljubomir Stojanović
 Vladimir Ćorović
 Alexander Solovyev

References 

1877 births
1950 deaths
Politicians from Kragujevac
Members of the Serbian Academy of Sciences and Arts
Belgrade Higher School alumni
Academic staff of the University of Belgrade
Writers from Kragujevac